Gerald Freeman (born 5 January 1941) is an Australian boxer. He competed in the men's light welterweight event at the 1960 Summer Olympics. At the 1960 Summer Olympics, he lost to Jaggie van Staden of Rhodesia.

References

1941 births
Living people
Australian male boxers
Olympic boxers of Australia
Boxers at the 1960 Summer Olympics
People from Bothwell
Light-welterweight boxers